Homalopterula gymnogaster is a species of ray-finned fish in the genus Homalopterula. It is commonly found in freshwater lakes Maninjau in West Sumatra, Indonesia.

References

Balitoridae
Fish described in 1853